Reseda luteola is a plant species in the genus Reseda. Common names include dyer's rocket, dyer's weed, weld, woold, and yellow weed. A native of Europe and Western Asia, the plant can be found in North America as an introduced species and common weed. While other resedas were used for the purpose, this species was the most widely used source of the natural dye known as weld. The plant is rich in luteolin, a flavonoid which produces a bright yellow dye. The yellow could be mixed with the blue from woad (Isatis tinctoria) to produce greens such as Lincoln green.

History and usage
The dye was in use by the first millennium BC, and perhaps earlier than either woad or madder. Until the discovery of quercitron it was the most used yellow dye but by the end of the 19th century had ceased to be in wide use due to the discovery of the synthetic aniline dyes which were cheaper to produce. Historically, France exported large quantities of weld.
It prefers waste places. Good weld for dye must have flowers of a yellow or greenish color, and abound in leaves; that which is small, thin-stemmed, and yellow is better than that which is large, thick-stemmed, and green; that which grows on dry, sandy soils is better than that produced on rich and moist soils. For the greatest production of coloring matter, the plant should be cut before the fruits show much development, otherwise the pigment diminishes. Dye from weld serves equally for linen, wool, and silk, dyeing with proper management all shades of yellow, and producing a bright and beautiful color.

Reseda is a primary dye for the wool tapestries at the Ramses Wissa Wassef Art Centre in Giza, Egypt.  Each February, the reseda is harvested for the annual wool dyeing event among all the artists at the centre.

Natural chemical constituents

A dominating natural plant chemical in Reseda luteola is glucobarbarin, named for its occurrence in a distantly related plant, Barbarea vulgaris. Glucobarbarin is a glucosinolate, the characteristic chemicals in the order Brassicales (Cabbages, mustards etc.) that Reseda luteola belongs to. When the plant is crushed, glucobarbarin is converted by an enzyme into barbarin (5-phenyl-1,3-oxazolidine-2-thione). This compound is sometimes (inappropriately) named resedinine, a name coined by Soviet researchers that rediscovered the compound in Reseda luteola  (Lutfullin et al., 1976) apparently without being aware of the previous discovery and naming in the west around two decades earlier. Yet another enzyme slowly converts barbarin into resedine (5-phenyl-1,3-oxazolidin-2-one), this chemical discovered and named by the same Soviet researchers (Lutfullin et al., 1976), giving it a name that is still valid. Barbarin and resedine can also be called alkaloids, but they are not typical alkaloids, in that they do not exist in the intact plant but are only formed after crushing the plant physically. Glucobarbarin, like other glucosinolates, is known to attract cabbage butterflies for egg-laying. Any ecological, medical or health effects of barbarin and resedine are poorly understood.

References

Lutfullin, KL, Tadzhibaev MM, Abdullaev UA, Malikov VM, Yunusov SY, 1976. Alkaloids of Reseda luteola. Khimya Prir. Soedin. 5, 625-630 (In Russian).

External links
Jepson Manual Treatment
Washington Burke Museum
Photo gallery

luteola
Plant dyes
Plants described in 1753
Taxa named by Carl Linnaeus